Alesya may refer to:

 Alesya (singer), Belarusian singer
 Alesya Kuznetsova (born 1992), Russian judoka
 "Alesya", a 1974 song by Belarusian band Pesniary
 A Belarusian-language diminutive of the given name Aleksandra

See also
 Alesia (disambiguation)
 Olesya (given name), the Russian and Ukrainian-language equivalent of Alesya

be:Алеся